William H. Parks was a politician from California who served in the California State Senate and California State Assembly, serving as the Speaker of the latter. He is one of only two people to be Speaker of the Assembly for two non-consecutive terms, the other being Frank Leslie Coombs. While in the State Senate, he was a candidate for President pro-tempore, but lost the election 25 to 1. 

In 1867, he was a candidate for State Secretary of State but lost the election. Parks also served as Provost Marshal of the Northern District of California in the 1860s.

References 

1824 births
1887 deaths
Speakers of the California State Assembly